Bagdarin Airport serves Bagdarin, Russia.

History
The airport was made in the tie of the Soviet Union time. In 1992 the airport was half closed. In 2007 it was closed due to money loss of Bural. In 2013 the airport was re-opened, when PANH opened the new flight to Ulan-Ude.

Airlines and destinations

References

External links

Airports in Buryatia
Airports built in the Soviet Union